The Mosonszolnok Wind Farm is a wind farm in Győr-Moson-Sopron County, Hungary. It has 12 individual wind turbines with a nominal output of around 2 MW which will deliver up to 24 MW of power, enough to power over 9,494 homes, with a capital investment required of approximately US$40 million.

References

Wind farms in Hungary